"Don't Let Go (Love)" is a song by American R&B group En Vogue. It was written by Ivan Matias, Andrea Martin, and Marqueze Etheridge, and produced by Organized Noize for the Set It Off soundtrack (1996), also appearing on the group's third album, EV3 (1997). The song was the group’s last single and music video to feature member Dawn Robinson and was En Vogue's biggest international single, making it to the top 10 in several countries. According to Billboard, the single ranked as the 83rd most successful single of the 1990s.

Background
"Don't Let Go (Love)" was written by Andrea Martin, Ivan Matias, Marqueze Ethridge, and Organized Noize members Sleepy Brown, Rico Wade, and Ray Murray, while production was by Organized Noize. Vocal production was supervised by Matias. Dawn Robinson sings the entire lead while Maxine Jones performs the bridge. Cindy Herron performs a verse to the bridge. Terry Ellis sings outro lyrics in the music video version and "Fulton Yard Mix". Martin Terry and Tommy Martin played the guitars on the song, while drums were played by Lil' John. Marvin "Chanz" Parkman played the grand piano.

The song compelled Elektra mogul Sylvia Rhone to place En Vogue back in the studio to record their EV3 project for release in 1997. While the other group members plus the record producers and label executives were focused on the new En Vogue album, Dawn Robinson wanted to pursue a solo career. Forced to choose between the group or her solo project, Robinson decided to leave En Vogue for a recording deal with Dr. Dre's Aftermath Records. The turn of events following the success of the song was the beginning of a long and tumultuous era for En Vogue as member changes became quite frequent.

Critical reception
AllMusic editor Stephen Thomas Erlewine described the song as "yearning". Larry Flick from Billboard called it a "bluesy interlude", and commented further that the harmonies are "instantly recognizable, flexing sweetly over the track's live funk beat and snaky guitar licks. If you're looking for a duplication of past hits, forget it. This is a far more musically mature effort that will appeal to both street and sophisticated tastes." J.D. Considine from Entertainment Weekly wrote in his review of EV3, "No surprise, then, that although the women get top billing, the arrangements are the real stars. "Don’t Let Go (Love)" is the most obvious example, since the interplay between lead and background vocals is as disciplined as it is dramatic." Another editor, David Grad noted its "combination of sensual harmonies and sultry attitude", and deemed it as a "provocative little offering". Dave Ferman from Fort Worth Star-Telegram said the song is "hauntingly lush", and that it "finds the singers' voices ebbing and flowing like the ocean on a threatening day." A reviewer from Music Week rated it four out of five, stating that "the girls let rip with a swoonsome, powerful single" and a "positive taster" for a spring album, that "should please fans and ensure they attract a few more." 

Gerald Martinez from New Straits Times called it "dramatic", noting that "this song has all the punch, power and stunning voices in harmony that one has come to expect from En Vogue." Rebecca Schiller from NME said the group's performance "was gutsy and full of knowing gravitas." Another editor, John Mulvey stated that the single "retains a frankly terrifying power". A reviewer for People Magazine wrote that it is "still smoldering", noting the song's "tough sound", and picking it as the highlight of EV3. Elysa Gardner from Rolling Stone described it as a "even more aggressive tune", and added that the "slow-burning" track "promote romantic and carnal abandon, advising lovers to proceed without caution." Laura Jamison from Salon Magazine noted it as a "tempestuous" and "sexy" single. Ann Powers from Spin called it a "cry for a lover's loyalty that En Vogue convert into a nonnegotiable demand". She complimented the song as their "highest achievement" on EV3. Ian Hyland from Sunday Mirror commented, "The hit singles Whatever and Don't Let Go may well be brilliant but they only add more spice to a mighty fine collection."

Commercial performance
"Don't Let Go (Love)" became the third En Vogue track to reach at number two on the U.S. Billboard Hot 100 where it was the group's sixth and final Top 10 hit. It also peaked at number two on the U.S. Mainstream Top 40 and ranks at number 43 on its all-time chart. The song was a number-one R&B song for one week, becoming En Vogue's sixth and final number-one R&B hit. It reached number five in the UK in early 1997 and spent 13 weeks in the UK top 40, eight of them in the top 10. The single re-entered the UK chart at number 23 in 2011 after the girl group Little Mix performed the song on the eighth series of the British television singing competition, The X Factor, on November 19, 2011. NME ranked the song number 127 in their list of the "150 Best Tracks Of The Past 15 Years" in 2011. The En Vogue hit reached number 23 on the UK chart and in Ireland, it also returned to the charts at number 50. In 1997, the song went to number one on the Norwegian top 20 singles chart (VG-Lista Topp 20) and stayed there for six consecutive weeks. In total, it was in the top 20 for 16 weeks. 
The single sold 1.3 million copies in the United States and was certified platinum by the RIAA.

Music video

The music video for "Don't Let Go (Love)" was directed by Matthew Rolston under the Alan Smithee pseudonym. It was En Vogue's third collaboration with Rolston following "My Lovin' (You're Never Gonna Get It)" and "Whatta Man".

The video shows En Vogue singing in front of an audience are dressed in black outfits while some clips of Set It Off are inserted. A second music video was released using the same footage of all four band members singing in front of an audience, but the scenes from Set It Off are replaced with images that followed a new storyline. In this version, Mekhi Phifer plays a man who has been secretly cheating all four band members. The four women find out about each other and confront Phifer's character through their performance at the party.

Legacy
In October 2011, NME placed the song at number 127 on its list "150 Best Tracks of the Past 15 Years". In 2018, Stacker ranked it number 43 in their list of "Best pop songs of the last 25 years". In 2019, Elle listed "Don't Let Go" at number 32 in their ranking of "52 Best 1990s Pop Songs"

Awards and nominations

Charts

Weekly charts

Year-end charts

Decade-end charts

All-time charts

Certifications

Release history

Other versions
 On November 19, 2011, girl group contestants Little Mix performed the song on the eighth series of the UK television talent contest The X Factor, leading to En Vogue's version re-entering the UK chart at number 23. In the finals, Little Mix performed the song for a second time and they won the show on December 11. The song is a bonus track on the group's winner's single, "Cannonball". Following the group's win and their single, the song re-entered the charts again a few weeks later at number 27. 
 US girl group Good Girl covered the song on America's Got Talent in the year of 2016.
 The British house music producer James Hype released a cover of the song titled "More Than Friends", with vocals by the south London artist Kelli-Leigh. "More Than Friends" peaked number eight on the UK Singles Chart in August 2017.
 Australian singer Greg Gould teamed up with En Vogue founding member Maxine Jones with a duet ballad version in 2017.
 In 2018, singers Kelsea Johnson and Jordyn Simone	performed the song during the Battle rounds on the 14th season of The Voice.
 Rock group Deepfield  covered the song for their debut album Archetypes and Repetition.

See also
 List of number-one R&B singles of 1997 (U.S.)
 List of number-one hits in Norway

References

1996 singles
En Vogue songs
Number-one singles in Denmark
Number-one singles in Norway
Songs written by Andrea Martin (musician)
Songs written by Ivan Matias
1996 songs
Song recordings produced by Organized Noize
Contemporary R&B ballads
1990s ballads
Music videos directed by Matthew Rolston
American pop rock songs
Songs written by Sleepy Brown
East West Records singles